Damdabaja (also Romanized as Dāmdābājā; also known as Dāmdāpājā) is a village in Pain Barzand Rural District, Anguti District, Germi County, Ardabil Province, Iran. At the 2006 census, its population was 78, in 22 families.

References 

Towns and villages in Germi County